Alexandrine Bonaparte, Princess of Canino and Musignano (née Alexandrine de Bleschamp; 23 February 1778 – 12 July 1855) was a French aristocrat. 

She was first married to the banker Hippolyte Jouberthon, with whom she had one child, Anne, in 1799, and thus known as "Madame Jouberthon". She was a widow when she became the second wife of Lucien Bonaparte, a younger brother of Napoleon I of France, in 1803.

Issue
She and her second husband had nine children, including:
Prince Charles Lucien Bonaparte (1803–1857)
Prince Paul Marie Bonaparte (1809–1827)
Prince Louis Lucien Bonaparte (1813–1891).
Prince Pierre Napoleon Bonaparte (1815–1881).

Ancestry

Sources

Hans Naef, 'Who's Who in Ingres's Portrait of the Family of Lucien Bonaparte?', The Burlington Magazine, Vol. 114, No. 836 (Nov., 1972), pp. 787–791 
Alexandrine as Terpsichore, by Canova

Italian princesses
Princesses of France (Bonaparte)
Princesses by marriage
House of Bonaparte
1778 births
1855 deaths